Julian Alistair Rhind-Tutt (born 20 July 1967) is an English actor, best known for playing Dr "Mac" Macartney in the comedy television series Green Wing (2004–2006).

Early life
Rhind-Tutt was born in West Drayton, Middlesex, the youngest of five; there was a 10-year gap between him and his two brothers and two sisters. He attended the John Lyon School in Harrow, Middlesex, where he acted in school productions, eventually taking the lead in a school production of Hamlet that played at the Edinburgh Festival Fringe in the mid-1980s. After reading English and Theatre Studies at the University of Warwick, he attended the Central School of Speech and Drama in London where he won the 1992 Carleton Hobbs Award from BBC Radio Drama.

Career
Rhind-Tutt's first significant acting role was as the Duke of York in The Madness of King George (1994). This was followed by a succession of lesser television and film roles. He then landed a major role in William Boyd's First World War drama The Trench (1999), alongside Paul Nicholls and Daniel Craig. His first major recurring TV role was co-starring in the Graham Linehan-Arthur Mathews sitcom Hippies (1999), and he subsequently appeared in several other major British sketch and situation comedy series of the period including Smack the Pony, Absolutely Fabulous and Black Books. He starred in Green Wing from 2004 to 2006, and had a major role in cult American show Keen Eddie as Inspector Monty Pippin. He appeared as a duellist in the video for Roots Manuva's single "Too Cold". He has appeared in over 50 radio productions.

In 2008, he narrated a short film for the 60th anniversary of the Universal Declaration of Human Rights. In 2015 he appeared in the TV series The Bastard Executioner as Lord Pembroke. In 2018, he appeared as the Marquess of Blayne in the Hulu original series Harlots.

Personal life
Rhind-Tutt is married to Slovenian make-up artist and yoga instructor Nataša Zajc. They have a son, Lucian.

Filmography

Film

Television

Theatre

Animated television series and video games

Radio

References

External links

interview on Channel 4's Green Wing microsite
The Other Man BBC Radio 4

1967 births
Alumni of the Royal Central School of Speech and Drama
Alumni of the University of Warwick
English male film actors
English male radio actors
English male Shakespearean actors
English male stage actors
English male television actors
Living people
Male actors from London
People educated at The John Lyon School
People from West Drayton